The Marlin Marlins were a minor league baseball team based in Marlin, Texas in 1916 and 1917. Succeeded by the Marlin Bathers in 1923, Marlin teams played as members of the Class D level Central Texas League in 1916 to 1917 and Texas Association from 1923 to 1925, hosting home games at Marlin City Park.

Four Major league baseball teams, most notably the New York Giants trained in Marlin, Texas for spring training from 1904 to 1918, overlapping with the beginning of minor league baseball in Marlin.

History
The Marlin Marlins were formed in 1916, playing as members of the Class D level Central Texas League, which formed as a six–team minor league. The six members of the 1916 Central Texas League were Marlin and the Ennis Tigers, Mexia Gassers, Temple Governors, Terrell Terrors and Waxahachie Buffaloes.

In their first season of league play, the 1916 Marlin Marlins finished last in the league standings. Marlin was in 6th place when the Central Texas League folded on July 16, 1916, before the conclusion of the season. With a 25–36 record, the Marlins placed 6th in the Central Texas League standings under managers Bob Tarleton, Bob Countryman and Fielder Murra. The Marlin Marlins finished 11.0 games behind the 1st place Temple Governors in the shortened season.

The Marlin Marlins played their final Central Texas League season in the 1917, as the league permanently folded during the season. The Central Texas League began the season as a four–team league. The Marlins finished in 3rd place overall after the Central Texas League began their third season of play on May 21, 1917, and disbanded on June 6, 1916. The other final league members joining Marlin in 1917 were the Ennis Tigers (8–7), Mexia Gassers (8–6) and Temple Governors/Corsicana Athletics (6–8). With a 7–8 record when the league folded, the Marlins finished 1.5 games behind the 1st place Mexia Gassers. The 1917 Marlins played under managers H. Sinclair and Ray Wakefield.

Minor league baseball returned in 1923, as the Marlin Bathers became charter members of the Class D level Texas Association. The "Bathers" moniker corresponds to the natural springs of the era that produced the hot, mineral water that brought tourists to Marlin, Texas in the era. The six–team league began play in 1923 with the Austin Rangers, Corsicana Oilers, Mexia Gushers, Sherman-Denison Twins, and Waco Indians Waco Indians joining Marlin as charter members. The Bathers finished with a record of 63–7, placing 5th in the Texas Association regular season standings. Playing under manager Walt Alexander, Marlin finished 14.0 games behind the 1st place Mexia Gushers in the final standings.

Marlin continued play in the six–team 1924 Texas Association. The Marlin Bathers placed 2nd overall. With a 73–55 record under returning manager Walt Alexander, Marlin finished 11.5 games behind the first place Corsicana Oilers.

In their final season, the Marlin Bathers relocated, during the 1925 Texas Association season. On May 13, 1924, with a 7–15 record, the Marlin Bathers moved to Palestine, Texas and finished the season playing as the Palestine Pals, placing 5th overall. The Marlin/Palestine team finished with a 58–75 overall record, playing under managers Fred Pipkin and Tommy McMillan.

Marlin, Texas has not hosted another minor league team.

The ballpark / Spring training ballparks

The Marlin teams were noted to have hosted home games at Marlin City Park. The ballpark was located on Muni Park Road off Williams Street, Marlin, Texas. City Park is still in use today as a public park with a ballpark. The park is noted to have entrances off of Williams Street and Bridge Street in Marlin, Texas.

Marlin, Texas also hosted spring training for major league baseball teams. The Chicago White Sox (1904), St. Louis Cardinals (1905), Cincinnati Reds (1906–1907) and New York Giants (1908–1918) all utilized the ballparks in Marlin, Texas for spring training. Teams were attracted to the mineral water baths in Marlin. It is unknown if the minor league teams utilized any of the facilities used by the major league teams, but given the small population of the town at the time (4,000), it is likely.

The White Sox, Cardinals and Reds are noted to have trained at a site near the fairgrounds in Marlin. This ballpark was called "Fairgrounds Field" or "East Side Field." It is possible this was the site of "Marlin City Park, " as Marlin City Park still hosts the Falls County Youth fairs at the site.

The Giants use of Emerson Park in Marlin is noted as being the first "permanent" spring training facility built by a major league team. The Giants' facility had a side field called Rimes Park and other practice areas. While the Giants use of Emerson Park directly overlaps the play of the Marlin Marlins, it is unknown if the minor league team played at the facility or if the Marlin Bathers used it after the Giants left. The ballpark was deeded to the New York Giants from the city and remained the property of the New York Giants and San Francisco Giants until the 1970s. Emerson Park was named after a local postmaster who was instrumental in developing the facility. The Giants would walk the one mile from the team hotel, The Arlington Hotel, to the ballpark twice a day everyday, walking along the railroad tracks. Every year, Marlin hosted a fish fry for the team before the Giants left to begin the regular season.

Timeline

Year–by–year records

Notable alumni
Walt Alexander (1923–1924, MGR)
Gene Bailey (1916)
Boom-Boom Beck (1925)
Buster Chatham (1923)
Joe Munson (1924)

See also
Marlin Bathers players

References

External links
Baseball Reference

Defunct minor league baseball teams
Professional baseball teams in Texas
Defunct baseball teams in Texas
Baseball teams established in 1916
Baseball teams disestablished in 1925
1916 establishments in Texas
Marlin, Texas
Falls County, Texas
Spring training ballparks
1925 disestablishments in Texas